Gezer is a kibbutz in central Israel. Located in the Shephelah between Modi'in, Ramle and Rehovot, it falls under the jurisdiction of Gezer Regional Council.

History
The kibbutz was established in 1945 on land purchased by the Ancient Order of Maccabeans in England, a philanthropic society founded in 1896. The land had traditionally belonged to the Palestinian village of Al-Qubab.

The pioneers were immigrants from Europe, who named the kibbutz after the biblical city of Gezer, identified as a tell (archaeological mound) located nearby. 

On 10 June 1948, the day after an attempt to take Latrun was performed by Yiftah and Harel brigades during the 1948 Arab–Israeli War, a battalion-size force of the Arab Legion, supported by irregulars and a dozen of armored cars, attacked the kibbutz. This was defended by 68 Haganah soldiers. After four hours of battle, the kibbutz fell. 39 defenders were killed, a dozen escaped, and the remaining were taken prisoner. Two Arab legionnaires were killed. At the evening, the kibbutz abandoned to the irregulars was taken back by two Palmach squads.

After the war it was rebuilt, but came apart in 1964 due to social difficulties. The current kibbutz was founded on 4 July 1974, by a Gar'in from North America.

Kibbutz Gezer Field is one of the few regulation baseball fields in Israel. Construction of the field in 1983, funded by American donors, took six weeks. The first game was played within a few months. A backstop, covered benches for players and a refreshment stand were added at a later date. In 1989, a scoreboard and outfield fence were erected for the Maccabiah Games.

Since 2014, a red-hair event has been held at the Kibbutz for the local Israeli red hair community. The festival includes performances, group discussions surrounding breaking stigmas about gingers, and even helps red heads to find their ginger spouse.  However, the number of attendees has to be restricted due to the risk of rocket attacks, leading to anger in the red-hair community.

Notable people
Alon Leichman, Olympian, member of the Israel national baseball team, and assistant pitching coach for the Cincinnati Reds

See also
Gezer (biblical city) and the Sack of Gezer
Gezer calendar - ancient artifact
Israel Baseball League

References

External links
Official website
Kibbutz Gezer - Yehudit Shaked  collection on the Digital collections of Younes and Soraya Nazarian Library, University of Haifa

Kibbutzim
Kibbutz Movement
Populated places established in 1945
Populated places in Central District (Israel)
1945 establishments in Mandatory Palestine
North American-Jewish culture in Israel